Lee Raymond (October 2, 1954 – December 12, 2013) was an American stock car racing driver. A two-time champion of the ARCA SuperCar Series, he also competed in NASCAR racing in the 1989 Daytona 500.

Racing career
A resident of Dayton, Ohio, Raymond made his debut in ARCA Racing Series competition in 1979. His career in the series ran through 1993; over the course of his career he won seven races and nine poles in the series, he won the series' Rookie of the Year award in 1982, and won back to back championships in the series in 1985 and 1986.

Raymond also competed in two NASCAR-sanctioned events over the course of his career; in 1985 in a Busch Series event at Indianapolis Raceway Park, where he finished 28th, and in the Winston Cup Series in the 1989 Daytona 500, finishing 26th.

Post-racing career
After his retirement from competition, Raymond was appointed director of competition at Kil-Kare Speedway. He had been inducted into the Kil-Kare Speedway and Dayton Speedway Halls of Fame. He died on December 12, 2013, after a brief battle with lung cancer.

Motorsports career results

NASCAR
(key) (Bold - Pole position awarded by qualifying time. Italics - Pole position earned by points standings or practice time. * – Most laps led.)

Winston Cup Series

Busch Series

References

External links
 

1954 births
2013 deaths
Racing drivers from Dayton, Ohio
NASCAR drivers
ARCA Menards Series drivers
Deaths from lung cancer
Deaths from cancer in Ohio